Casa Manzoni (in English Manzoni House) is a historical palace sited in via Morone 1 near the quadrilateral of fashion in the center of Milan, Italy.  Owned by the Manzoni family, the house was the birthplace of the famous Italian writer Alessandro Manzoni in 1785.

The building is also the venue of a museum dedicated to the poet life, the National Center for Manzonian Studies and the Historical Lombard Society (that has collected over 40,000 volumes about the history of Lombardy).

Built in the 18th century, the palace was restored in 1864 by Andrea Boni in Renaissance Revival style, which especially characterizes the façade overlooking Belgiojoso square, designed in 1864 at the request of Manzoni by architect Andrea Boni and covered with red terracotta.

The palace has hosted the gatherings of the club Il Conciliatore; famous men such as Giuseppe Verdi, Cavour and Garibaldi have visited it.

On the ground floor, there's the seat of the Historical Lombard Society, a specialized library with a collection of over 40,000 volumes, and the National Center for Manzonian Studies.

The Manzoni Museum is located in two rooms overlooking the garden on the ground floor and in six rooms on the first floor: the original furnishing and ornaments have all been entirely preserved.

See also 
 Alessandro Manzoni

Bibliography 
 Milano e i suoi palazzi: Porta Vercellina, Comasina e Nuova, Attilia Lanza, 1992, Libreria Meravigli Editrice. (Italian language)
 Le città d'arte:Milano, Guide brevi Skira, ed.2008, autori vari. (Italian language)
 Milano e Provincia, Touring Club Italiano, ed.2003, autori vari. (Italian language)

References

Sources

External links 
 National Center for Manzonian Studies
 Historical Lombard Society

Palaces in Milan
Renaissance Revival architecture in Italy
Tourist attractions in Milan
Alessandro Manzoni